Lake Achen is a lake in Austria, north of Jenbach in Tyrol. Lake Achen is also called "Fjord of the Alps" and "Tyrolean Sea". Together with the Achen Valley, it parts the Karwendel mountain range in the west from the Brandenberg Alps in the east.

An alpine lake, water temperature is accordingly low, rarely above . Its size and wind conditions make it suitable for windsurfing.

Eben am Achensee, Achenkirch, and Pertisau are municipalities on the lake. The Achensee and its hinterland serves as the model for the 'Tiernsee', setting of the Chalet School series of children's books by Elinor M. Brent-Dyer.

History
The city of Innsbruck bought the lake in 1919 from the St. Georgenberg-Fiecht Abbey, who had received it from the rulers of Schlitters around 1120.

Due to various texts and illustrations in the hunting and fishing manuscripts of Emperor Maximilian, Lake Achensee was famous already at the beginning of the 15th century.

Powerplant
Since 1924, the lake is managed by the Tiroler Wasserkraft AG (TIWAG), which was founded for this purpose.

Originally, its only outflow was the Achenbach, feeding the Isar. Since 1927, when a power plant in Jenbach was finished, it primarily feeds the Inn, at a level difference of 380 m below. Eight pelton wheels at 500 RPM produce a total of 96 MW.

In winter, the level of the lake is lowered by up to 6 meters; accordingly the size of the lake keeps changing. At maximum level, the reservoir can store 66 million m³ of water.

Tourism

When the Lower Inn Valley Railway railway was finished in 1859, tourism started to flourish. In order to make the abbey profit, the first steamboat St. Josef was acquired in 1887.
Furthermore the construction of the 7 km long Achenseebahn narrow gauge rack railway was initiated, which went into service in 1889 between Jenbach and Seespitz. On 21 July that year a second steamboat, the St. Benedikt, went into service. In 1890 the two boats with a capacity of 320 seats transported about 30,000 persons.

In 1911 a third scheduled boat, the Stella Maris went into service. It was the first passenger boat on a lake in the Danubian monarchy originally equipped with a diesel engine. The boat was designed for 400 passengers, and featured a particularly silent engine at low rpm, similar to those that later were used in the submarines of World War I.

However, the Stella Maris was difficult to manoeuvre. When the lake was bought by the city of Innsbruck in 1919, the boat was renamed into Stadt Innsbruck. In 1925 a motorboat named Tirol was acquired, and in 1927 for the first time more than 100,000 persons were transported.

In 1959 the St. Benedikt was replaced with a modern ship of the same name with a diesel engine. In 1971 the Tirol was replaced with a larger Tirol II for 40 passengers. In 1994 the MS Tirol went into service, replacing the Stadt Innsbruck, and in August 2007 the MS Stadt Innsbruck replaced the St. Benedikt.

Recreation 
Achen Lake is a large tourist destination year round.

In the summer, Achen Lake is used for various watersports, swimming, and boating. The land surrounding the lake has a lot to offer guests with over 500 kilometers of marked hiking trails, 250 kilometers of (e-)bike routes, 183 kilometers of signposted running trails, numerous climbing and via ferrata routes, and two perfectly groomed golf courses.

In the winter, the area around Achen Lake continues to draw toursits as a cross-country skiing hub. The region’s ski areas have 53 km of family-friendly slopes and bespoke offers for children. With over 220 kilometres of trails groomed for classic skiing and numerous tracks for adaptive skiing, Lake Achensee is rightly known as one of the country’s best Nordic skiing destinations.

Gallery

Notes and references

Literature 
 Naupp, Thomas OSB und Pinggera, Dr. Gert-Klaus: Stiftsmuseum Fiecht, Dokumente zur Geschichte von St. Georgenberg-Fiecht (Katalog)
 Armbruster, Karl; Pawlik, Hans Peter: Jenbach – Achensee. Die Tiroler Zahnradbahn. Slezak Verlag, Wien 1993; 96 S.

External links

 Achensee powerplant, architecture archive

Lakes of Tyrol (state)
Reservoirs in Austria